Akkimaradi  is a village in the southern state of Karnataka, India. It is located in the Mudhol taluk of Bagalkot district in Karnataka.

See also
Mahalingpur
 Bagalkot
 Districts of Karnataka

References

Mahalingpur

External links
 http://Bagalkot.nic.in/

Villages in Bagalkot district